Augustin Sagna (October 23, 1920 – December 12, 2012) was a Senegalese prelate of the Roman Catholic Church.

Sagna was born in Ziguinchor, Senegal and ordained a priest on March 17, 1950, for the Diocese of Ziguinchor. Sagna was appointed bishop of the Diocese of Ziguinchor on September 29, 1966, and consecrated on January 15, 1967. Sagna served the Diocese of Ziguinchor until his retirement on his 75th birthday.

External links
Catholic-Hierarchy

1920 births
2012 deaths
20th-century Roman Catholic bishops in Senegal
People from Ziguinchor
Roman Catholic bishops of Ziguinchor